Pseudoamblystegium is a genus of mosses belonging to the family Amblystegiaceae.

Species:
 Pseudoamblystegium subtile (Hedw.) Vanderp. & Hedenäs

References

Amblystegiaceae
Moss genera